The Gypsy Joker Motorcycle Club (GJMC), are a "one-percenter" motorcycle club that was originally formed in San Bernardino, California on April Fool's Day, 1956. Though founded in the United States, the MC expanded successfully overseas and is now one of the most notorious and feared motorcycle clubs in Australia and Norway.

It is considered by many to be one of the most difficult clubs in which to achieve full membership, due to tough requirements and a "prospecting" time that usually takes at least two years, as pointed out in the book The Brotherhoods: Inside the Outlaw Motorcycle Clubs by Professor Arthur Veno.

Australia
In November 1969, Gypsy Joker Motorcycle Club Australia was founded by former members of the St Mary's Motorcycle Club who enjoyed riding Harley Davidson motorcycles. Sydney was the first chapter.

Following a friendly amalgamation with the notorious South Australian formed Mandamas MC and Gypsy Joker MC. the group has had a high profile in Australia, especially in the southern and western regions. They are well known in Australia for the 2001 car bomb murder of Western Australia's former chief detective Don Hancock. The gang had an altercation with Hancock at the hotel he owned in Ora Banda which is 60 km north of Kalgoorlie. After setting up a campsite, Gypsy Joker Billy Grierson was shot dead by a sniper and it was alleged that Hancock was the shooter.

Gypsy Joker members claimed that on January 12, 2001, a member was severely beaten by police in Adelaide, South Australia for refusing to remove his motorcycle helmet and sunglasses.

In February 2008, police forced the Gypsy Jokers to dismantle its clubhouse fortifications, which include a concrete front wall, surveillance cameras and modified doors, in Perth, Western Australia. The club said the security was needed in the area where the burglary rate is high.

Two Gypsy Joker members were jailed on March 5, 2009 on charges of assault. On May 12, 2007, Dean Alan Adams and Peter Floyd Robinson attacked Petera Heta Haimona outside the Cactus Club in Gosnells, Western Australia and beat him with metal pipes.

A Gypsy Joker was charged with unlawful possession of a large sum of cash, weapons and ammunition on August 17, 2007. Police pulled his car over and discovered a gun, an expandable baton, capsicum spray and ammunition when they searched his vehicle.

A Gypsy Joker member was charged with attempted murder on March 17, 2009. He shot and wounded a member of the Newboys gang and former Hells Angel outside their clubhouse in Adelaide, South Australia.

On May 19, 2009, five Gypsy Jokers were involved in a drug-related shoot-out with another gang in Perth, Western Australia. Two were wounded and taken to hospital, one of which was Club President Leonard Mark Kirby.

On April 14, 2012, Gypsy Joker Anthony Perish, his brother Andrew (a Rebels Motorcycle Club gang member) and Matthew Lawton were sentenced to eighteen, nine and fifteen years respectively for the murder of convicted drug trafficker Terry Falconer, conspiracy to commit murder and firearms and drug offences.

United States
In December 1981, Donald Manuel Paradis, a Leader of the Gypsy Jokers motorcycle gang, was convicted of the June 21, 1980 murder of Kimberly Anne Palmer, 19. Palmer and her boyfriend Scott Currier were murdered in Paradis's home. Paradis helped move the bodies to Post Falls, ID. Medical pathologist, William Brady, fostered the impression that Ms. Palmer had been killed in Idaho. This allowed Idaho to charge and convict Paradis with murder and sentenced to death. Public outcry and legal appeals managed to make it clear that the prosecution had withheld potentially exculpatory evidence, and Mr. Paradis’s conviction was overturned. When Paradis finally won release from prison in April, 2001, David Bond was widely credited with contribution to his case. "Dave Bond believed in me," Paradis noted. "And he got a whole bunch of people to believe in me."

In 2004, the police raided the Gypsy Joker clubhouse in Portland, Oregon looking for two men wanted for armed robbery one of whom went by the street name Brick. (Brick later was found dead due to an altercation with a rival gang and could not be tried for said crimes.) The men were not there, however, and the club sued the Portland Police Bureau for $50,000 because of the damage caused in the raid.

On April 10, 2008, police raided the Gypsy Joker clubhouse in Kennewick, Washington and arrested four men for possession of methamphetamine. Stolen property and weapons were also seized from the premises.

On August 13, 2009, police in Nampa, Idaho, with assistance of the FBI, pulled over and detained approximately 60 to 70 members of the Gypsy Joker MC just off exit 38 on interstate 84. They were searched, interrogated, and photographed for future reference by law enforcement concerning gang affiliated activity.

As of July 2016, three people in Oregon are facing two counts of murder, one count each of criminal conspiracy to commit murder and two counts each of criminal conspiracy to commit kidnapping regarding the killing of Robert Huggins, once a high-ranking member of the group. Others are accused of hindering prosecution in this case. The investigation lead to a raid of the Gypsy Joker clubhouse in North Portland that same year. Huggins' body was found beaten and mutilated in July 2015. His killers shot nails through his boots, carved out an ‘X’ on his body and knocked out his teeth.

On January 31, 2019 six members of the Oregon Gypsy Joker MC were charged with multiple crimes.  The U.S. Attorney's Office said five defendants face charges of murder in aid of racketeering, kidnapping in aid of racketeering resulting in death, kidnapping resulting in death and conspiracy to commit kidnapping resulting in death for the June 30 to July 2, 2015 kidnapping and murder of Robert Huggins. Huggins was a former GJOMC member and resident of southeast Portland. The five defendants are accused of killing Huggins to maintain and increase their positions in the criminal club.

Norway 
Gypsy Joker MC Norway started out as a local Harley Davidson club on the 1st of April, 1997 under the name JOKER MC. The path towards becoming a new international chapter of the Gypsy Joker MC started in 2007.  

In 2008 Joker MC members were seen wearing the 1% patch on their colors. For the time being it was still a local 1%-er club, but Gypsy Joker members were frequently observed around the clubhouse. 

As the suspected plans of a merger became known, other international 1%er clubs opposed the idea of a new international 1%-er club being established in the country. Meanwhile, Joker MC made headlines after a bar brawl in a neighboring city, and after several local business shops put up signs with “Protected by Joker MC”. The police were fearing racketeering and mafia-style conditions in the city, and the club came under heavier surveillance. Several police raids followed in the years to come, without any charges being made.  

Meanwhile, things started to heat up, and the Norwegian Police Security Service put the biker clubs as one of the highest ranking threats for domestic safety as they feared a new biker war brewing. The Joker MC clubhouse was fortified, and members of the club was observed riding with bullet proof vests under their colors/patch.  

In November 2011 several Gypsy Jokers came to Norway from abroad, but were all stopped at the airport, where they were incarcerated for days before being shipped back home without being able to enter Norway. At the same time several police officers raided the Joker MC clubhouse. The Norwegian police treatment of the bikers caused several headlines in the US, as several of the members were US Veterans. 

Just days after a big sign with Gypsy Joker MC decorated the former Joker MC clubhouse. Although the club rarely makes any public comments, a spokesperson did in this case make a statement, clearly meant as a jest on behalf of the police, calling the finalization of the patch-over a Christmas gift for the local police and their constant quest for more money and resources.  

Although the club mostly keeps to itself, they continue to draw attention from both the public and the police, with the latest known police raid being in 2020 when armed police raided the club on the suspicion of a case involving violence and bodily harm. No charges were made following the raid. 

Gypsy Joker MC Norway holds an annual Joker Run every 1st of May, gathering over hundred local bikers from different local motorcycle clubs. 

Gypsy Joker MC Norway have a support club in Brazil, Jesters MC, established in 2016. Gypsy Joker members are frequently seen in Brazil. The pattern is similar to the patchover of Joker MC and its assumed that the Jesters MC is a foothold for the club to establish a full Gypsy Joker MC chapter in Brazil with time.

See also

List of outlaw motorcycle clubs
Criminal Law (Criminal Organisations Disruption) Amendment Act 2013

Notes

References

 
 
  
 
 
 
 
 
 
 
 
  
 Thompson, Hunter S. (1966). Hell's Angels: The Strange and Terrible Saga of the Outlaw Motorcycle Gangs (Paperback ed.). Penguin Books. p. 164. .

External links

Outlaw motorcycle clubs
Organizations established in 1956
Gangs in Australia
Gangs in California
Gangs in Oregon
Gangs in Washington (state)
Motorcycle clubs in the United States
1956 establishments in California
Motorcycle clubs in Australia